Shirish B Patel, born 1932, is an Indian Civil Engineer and the founder of Shirish Patel & Associates (SPA), a company which designs, manages and inspects structural engineering projects.  Patel is a writer and speaker in the media on the topic of urban planning and urban density.

Patel also helped to form the Indian Institute for Human Settlements. He was also a founding member of the Housing Development Finance Corporation.

Career 
Patel founded his engineering firm in 1960. He was the main designer of the Kemp’s Corner Flyover, the first in India, using new construction technology which had not been tried in India before.

Patel and two other authors created a plan in 1965 to create a new city across the harbour from Bombay.  When the project was accepted by the government, Patel co-ordinated the implementation of the plan as New Bombay was constructed between 1970 and 1974.

As well as planning and design, Patel and his company are often called upon to perform infrastructure inspections, data collection and analysis and other consulting work.

References

External links 

 Indian Institute for Human Settlements
 Shirish Patel and Associates Consultants Private Ltd.
 Larsen and Toubro, Engineering Construction & Contracts Division
 India Habitat Centre
 Housing Development Finance Corporation 
 The Institution of Engineers, India
 American Concrete Institute
 Consulting Engineers Association (India) 
 American Society of Civil Engineers  
 International Association for Bridge and Structural Engineering  
 International Association for Shell & Spatial Structures

Indian civil engineers

1932 births
Living people